Alpine skiing at the 2002 Winter Paralympics consisted of 53 events, 34 for men and 19 for women which all took place at the Snowbasin Ski Area.

Medal table

Medal summary 
The competition events were:
Downhill: men – women
Super-G: men – women
Giant slalom: men – women
Slalom: men – women

Each event had separate standing, sitting, or visually impaired classifications:

LW2 – standing: single leg amputation above the knee
LW3 – standing: double leg amputation below the knee, mild cerebral palsy, or equivalent impairment
LW4 – standing: single leg amputation below the knee
LW5/7 – standing: double arm amputation
LW6/8 – standing: single arm amputation
LW9 – standing: amputation or equivalent impairment of one arm and one leg
LW 10 – sitting: paraplegia with no or some upper abdominal function and no functional sitting balance
LW 11 – sitting: paraplegia with fair functional sitting balance
LW 12 – sitting: double leg amputation above the knees, or paraplegia with some leg function and good sitting balance
B1 – visually impaired: no functional vision
B2 – visually impaired: up to ca 3-5% functional vision
B3 – visually impaired: under 10% functional vision

Men's events

Women's events

See also
Alpine skiing at the 2002 Winter Olympics

References 

 

 

 Winter Sport Classification, Canadian Paralympic Committee
Paralympics - Alpine skiing: Results - Super-G, Deseret News 
Paralympics - Alpine skiing: Men's and women's downhill results, Deseret News 
Paralympics - Alpine skiing medals - Giant slalom events, Deseret News 
Paralympics - Paralympic alpine-skiing times - Saturday's slalom events at Snowbasin Ski area, Deseret News 

2002 Winter Paralympics events
2002
Paralympics
Alpine skiing at the 2002 Winter Paralympics